St Katarina Church is a Roman Catholic church in Nijemci, Croatia. The Catholic parish in Nijemci was mentioned for the first time in the 13th century. In 1332 it was a seat of one of the largest parishes in the Western Sirmium. The St Katarina Church was built in 1729 and has been refurbished several times since then.

References

External links
http://zupa-nijemci.hr/index.html

Churches in Croatia
Churches completed in 1729
Roman Catholic churches in Vukovar-Syrmia County
1729 establishments in the Habsburg monarchy
18th-century establishments in Hungary